Dunje is a village in Municipality of Prilep, North Macedonia. It used to be part of the former municipality of Vitolište.

During the ancient times it was the settlement Dostoneoi.

Demographics
Dunje appears in 15th century Ottoman defters as a village in the nahiyah of Mariovo. Among its inhabitants, a certain Dimitri Arbanas is recorded as a household head. The name Arbanas, is a medieval rendering for Albanian, indicating an Albanian presence in the village.

According to the 2002 census, the village had a total of 77 inhabitants. Ethnic groups in the village include:

Macedonians 77

References

Villages in Prilep Municipality